Lampropeltis nigra, commonly known as the black kingsnake, is a species of nonvenomous colubrid snake indigenous to the United States.  It is a species of kingsnake.

Description
The black kingsnake is a large to medium constrictor. It is generally similar to L. getula getula, although its can be distinguished by its geography and appearance. It has a black body that is interspersed with widely spaced yellow or cream-colored speckles, larger and more numerous along the sides. The dorsum in some is unpatterned and in others crossbanded. The venter displays a checked black and yellow (or cream) pattern. Ventral scales range from 197 to 222 in both sexes, with subcaudal scales ranging from 45 to 59 in males and 37 to 51 in females.

Geographic range
The black kingsnake is found in the southeastern quarter of the United States, ranging from southern Illinois to Ohio, then down along the foothills of the Appalachian Mountains and the Alabama River watershed to the northern Gulf Coast in south Alabama and along the coast to the Mississippi River in Louisiana.

Habitat

Black kingsnakes occupy a wide variety of habitats and are one of the most frequently encountered species by humans in some states.  Preferred habitats include abandoned farmsteads, debris piles, edges of floodplains, and thick brush around streams and swamps.

References

nigra
Reptiles of the United States
Reptiles described in 1882
Taxa named by Henry Crécy Yarrow